Michael Dixon (14 March 1937 – 13 November 2022) was an English professional footballer who played as a centre forward.

Career
Born in Willesden, Dixon played for Sundon Park, Hitchin Town, Luton Town, Coventry City, Cambridge United, Stevenage Town, Dunstable Town and Biggleswade Town. He also had trials at Arsenal and Brighton & Hove Albion.

Personal life
His son Kerry was also a footballer. Dixon died on 13 November 2022, at the age of 85.

References

1937 births
2022 deaths
English footballers
Hitchin Town F.C. players
Luton Town F.C. players
Coventry City F.C. players
Cambridge United F.C. players
Stevenage Town F.C. players
Dunstable Town F.C. players
Biggleswade Town F.C. players
English Football League players
Association football forwards
Footballers from Willesden